John Yi Yun-il (1822 – January 21, 1867) was a Korean Catholic who was killed during the 19th-century Korean persecution of Christians. He was a family man who made his living as a farmer and who also served as a catechist, i.e. a teacher of Christian religion.

Death
John Yi Yun-il was killed at Gwandeokjeong, a military training center in the city of Daegu in modern-day South Korea, in the course of the Joseon Dynasty's persecution of Catholics that began in 1866. Though flogged until the flesh of his limbs was torn, he remained strong in the Christian faith, and he was finally decapitated.

Sainthood
He is venerated in the Catholic Church as a martyr and was canonized as one of 103 Korean martyr saints by John Paul II on May 6, 1984.

He is one of two patron saints of the Archdiocese of Daegu, along with Our Lady of Lourdes. His body is preserved in a chapel in the Archdiocese of Daegu. At the time of John's death, the site of his execution, Gwandeokjeong was used for the execution of criminals. Due to the number of Christian martyrs who were executed there, the site is now treated by the Archdiocese as a sacred place.

John Yi Yun-il's feast day is January 21, the day of his death, and he is also venerated along with the rest of the 103 Korean martyrs on September 20.

References

1822 births
1867 deaths
19th-century Roman Catholic martyrs
Korean Roman Catholic saints
Deaths by decapitation
Korean farmers
Joseon Christians